Greatest Hits is a compilation album of songs taken from Buddy Holly's three original albums, The "Chirping" Crickets, Buddy Holly and That'll Be the Day, released in 1996 by MCA Records. It includes top ten hits "Peggy Sue" and "Oh, Boy!", along with number-one hit "That'll Be the Day".

Track listing 
 "That'll Be the Day"
 "I'm Looking for Someone to Love"
 "Words of Love"
 "Not Fade Away"
 "Everyday"
 "Oh, Boy!"
 "Peggy Sue"
 "I'm Gonna Love You Too"
 "Maybe Baby"
 "Rave On!"
 "Think It Over"
 "Fool's Paradise"
 "Early in the Morning"
 "It's So Easy"
 "Heartbeat"
 "True Love Ways"
 "It Doesn't Matter Anymore"
 "Raining in My Heart"

References

External links

Buddy Holly compilation albums
1994 greatest hits albums
Compilation albums published posthumously